Samuel Onyedikachi Acho (born September 6, 1988) is a Nigerian-American ESPN sports analyst, a nine-year veteran of the National Football League (NFL), a Vice President of the NFL Players Association, and author of Let the World See You: How to Be Real in a World Full of Fakes, which was published in late 2020.

Acho played college football at the University of Texas, started at linebacker for the Arizona Cardinals and on special teams for the  Chicago Bears, and has won multiple awards related to leadership and scholarship.

Early years
Acho was born in Dallas, Texas. He graduated from the St. Mark's School of Texas, where he was on the academic honor roll during each of his 4 years of high school. Acho was named to the all conference football team during his last 3 years of high school. He was named team co-captain for both his junior and senior years. He was also the state private school champion in both the shot put and discus. As of 2018, Sam Acho still holds the school record in the 12 pound shot put (57'9.25, while his brother Emmanuel is 2nd all time at 57'4.25). In the 1.6 lb discus, Acho is 3rd all time at St. Mark's (162' 3) while his brother Emmanuel is first (177'3). During his senior year on the basketball team, Acho averaged 12 points and 15 rebounds per game.

Out of high school, Acho was rated the 6th best football prospect at his position (weak side defensive end) in the country, despite playing for a small boys school that is better known for its academics (one rating service concluded his school was the best 12-year private school in the country and the best science-oriented school—public or private—in the state).

College career
Acho played defensive end in college. As a freshman at the University of Texas, Acho played in 11 games, recording six tackles and a sack. As a sophomore in 2008, he recorded 15 tackles and three sacks. As a junior in 2009, Acho started all 14 games and was named honorable mention All-Big 12 by The Associated Press after recording 55 tackles and eight sacks. After his senior season in 2010, Acho was voted team MVP.

Professional career
Acho attended the NFL Scouting Combine in Indianapolis and performed all of the combine and positional drills. On March 29, 2011, he participated at Texas' pro day, but chose to stand on his combine numbers and only performed positional drills. At the conclusion of the pre-draft process, Acho was projected to be a second or third round pick by the majority of NFL draft experts and scouts. He was ranked as the seventh best outside linebacker in the draft by DraftScout.com.

Arizona Cardinals
The Arizona Cardinals selected Acho in the fourth round (103rd overall) of the 2011 NFL Draft. Acho was the 12th defensive end drafted in 2011.

2011
On July 29, 2011, the Arizona Cardinals signed Acho to a four-year, $2.51 million contract that includes a signing bonus of $474,428.

Throughout training camp, Acho competed to be a starting outside linebacker against Clark Haggans and O'Brien Schofield. Head coach Ken Whisenhunt named Acho a backup outside linebacker to begin the regular season, behind Joey Porter, Clark Haggans, and O'Brien Schofield.

He made his professional regular season debut in the Arizona Cardinals' season-opener against the Carolina Panthers and made his first career regular season tackle in their 28–21 victory. On October 23, 2011, Acho recorded two solo tackles and made his first career sack during a 32–20 loss against the Pittsburgh Steelers in Week 7. Acho sacked Steelers' quarterback Ben Roethlisberger for a five-yard loss in the fourth quarter. On October 30, 2011, Acho earned his first career start and recorded five combined tackles, a sack, and forced the first fumble of his career during a 30–27 loss at the Baltimore Ravens in Week 8. Acho forced a fumble while sacking quarterback Joe Flacco for a ten-yard loss in the third quarter. Acho remained the starting outside linebacker for the last ten games of the season after Joey Porter was placed on injured reserve due to a knee injury. In Week 10, he collected a season-high six solo tackles during a 21–17 win at the Philadelphia Eagles. He finished his rookie season in 2011 with 40 combined tackles (35 solo), seven sacks, two pass deflections, and four forced fumbles in 16 games and ten starts. Acho's seven sacks are the second most ever by a Cardinals rookie, trailing Simeon Rice’s 12.5 in 1996.

2012
During training camp, Acho competed to retain his role as a starting outside linebacker against O'Brien Schofield and Clark Haggans. Head coach Ken Whisenhunt named Acho and O'Brien Schofield the starting outside linebackers to begin the regular season, along with inside linebackers Daryl Washington and Paris Lenon.

On October 21, 2012 Acho recorded four combined tackles, deflected a pass, and made his first career interception during a 21–14 loss at the Minnesota Vikings. Acho made his first career interception off a pass by Vikings' quarterback Christian Ponder, that was originally intended for running back Adrian Peterson, in the second quarter. In Week 14, he collected a season-high seven combined tackles in the Cardinals' 58–0 loss at the Seattle Seahawks. He started in all 16 games in 2012 and recorded a career-high 48 combined tackles (35 solo), four sacks, three pass deflections, and two interceptions.

2013
On January 8, 2013, the Arizona Cardinals fired head coach Ken Whisenhunt after they finished with a 5–11 record. Defensive coordinator Todd Bowles held a competition for the jobs as the starting outside linebackers between Acho, O'Brien Schofield, Lorenzo Alexander, and Alex Okafor. Head coach Bruce Arians named Acho and Lorenzo Alexander the starting outside linebackers to start the regular season, along with inside linebackers Karlos Dansby and Jasper Brinkley.

He started in the Arizona Cardinals' season-opener at the St. Louis Rams and collected a season-high two solo tackles and forced a fumble in their 27–25 loss. In Week 3, Acho made two solo tackles and a sack before exiting the Cardinals' 31–7 loss at the New Orleans Saints in the third quarter due to an ankle injury. On September 23, 2013, the Arizona Cardinals placed Acho on injured reserve after he was diagnosed with a broken left fibula and was scheduled to miss the remainder of the season. He finished the season with five solo tackles, a sack, and a forced fumble in three games and ten starts.

2014
Acho entered training camp slated as a starting outside linebacker and saw competition from Lorenzo Alexander, John Abraham, and Matt Shaughnessy. Head coach Bruce Arians named Acho a backup outside linebacker to begin the regular season, behind John Abraham and Matt Shaughnessy. On September 14, 2014, Acho recorded a solo tackle, broke up a pass, and intercepted a pass by Giants' quarterback Eli Manning during a 25–14 win at the New York Giants in Week 2. In Week 12, he collected a season-high four combined tackles in the Cardinals' 10–3 loss to the Seattle Seahawks. The following week, he tied his season-high of four combined tackles during a 29–18 loss at the Atlanta Falcons in Week 13. He finished the 2014 season with 31 combined tackles (23 solo), three pass deflections, an interception, and a sack in 16 games and four starts.

The Arizona Cardinals finished second in the NFC West with an 11–5 record and earned a wildcard berth. On January 3, 2015, Acho started in the NFC Wildcard Game and recorded seven combined tackles and forced a fumble during a 27–16 loss at the Carolina Panthers.

Chicago Bears

2015
On April 1, 2015, the Chicago Bears signed Acho to a one-year, $840,000 contract. During training camp, Acho competed to be a starting outside linebacker against Jared Allen, Lamarr Houston, David Bass, and Willie Young. Acho was sidelined for three weeks during the preseason after suffering from mononucleosis.  On September 12, 2015, the Chicago Bears terminated Acho's contract after he was ruled inactive due to his illness. On September 14, 2015, the Chicago Bears re-signed Acho to a one-year, $840,000 contract. In Week 5, he collected a season-high six solo tackles during an 18–17 loss at the Kansas City Chiefs. Acho shared starts with Willie Young and finished his first season with the Bears in 2015 with 39 combined tackles (30 solo), a pass deflection, a forced fumble, and one fumble recovery in 15 games and seven starts.

2016
On March 28, 2016, the Chicago Bears signed Acho to a one-year, $840,000 contract with a signing bonus of $80,000. During training camp, Acho competed to be a starting outside linebacker against Pernell McPhee, Lamarr Houston, Willie Young, and rookie Leonard Floyd. Head coach John Fox named Acho the backup outside linebacker to begin the regular season, behind Willie Young and Leonard Floyd.

On September 18, 2016, Acho recorded three combined tackles and sacked quarterback Carson Wentz during a 29–14 loss to the Philadelphia Eagles in Week 2. The sack became his first since 2014. The following week, he collected season-high four combined tackles in the Bears' 31–17 loss at the Dallas Cowboys in Week 3. He finished the 2016 season with 27 combined tackles (18 solo), a pass deflection, a sack, and a forced fumble in 16 games and six starts.

2017
On April 15, 2017, the Chicago Bears signed Acho to a one-year, $855,000 contract with $130,000 guaranteed and a signing bonus of $80,000.

During training camp, Acho competed for a roster spot as a starting outside linebacker against Pernell McPhee, Willie Young, Leonard Floyd, Dan Skuta, and Lamarr Houston.

Acho became a starting outside linebacker for the last nine games of the regular season after Willie Young and Leonard Floyd both suffered injuries and were placed on injured reserve. On December 10, 2017, he collected a season-high five combined tackles during a 33–7 loss at the Cincinnati Bengals. He finished the 2017 season with 45 combined tackles (29 solo), three sacks, a pass deflection and a forced fumble in 16 games and 12 starts. Pro Football Focus gave Acho an overall grade of 59.8, which ranked 88th among all edge rushers.

2018
On January 1, 2018, the Bears fired head coach John Fox after they finished the 2017 season with a 5–11 record. Head coach Matt Nagy opted to retain Vic Fangio as the Bears' defensive coordinator. On March 14, 2018, the Chicago Bears signed Acho to a two-year, $5.50 million contract with $2.95 million guaranteed and signing bonus $500,000. On October 8, 2018, Acho was placed on season-ending injured reserve after suffering a torn pectoral muscle.

On March 5, 2019, the Bears released Acho, ending his 51-game, 25-start tenure with 140 total tackles (17 on special teams), four sacks, three forced fumbles, and a fumble recovery.

Buffalo Bills
On August 11, 2019, Acho was signed by the Buffalo Bills. He was released on August 31, 2019.

Tampa Bay Buccaneers
On November 5, 2019, Acho signed a one-year contract with the Tampa Bay Buccaneers, reuniting him with former coach Bruce Arians.

Off the field activities
 NFL Players Association representative for the Chicago Bears (2018)
 Vice President, Executive Committee, NFL Player's Association (2018)

Awards
In college, Acho won the William V. Campbell Trophy, given annually to college football's top scholar-athlete, as well as the Wuerffel Trophy, college football's premier award for outstanding community service, He was a finalist for the Lott Trophy, which is an award focused on character. During his senior year, the Sporting News named Acho one of the 20 smartest athletes in sports, a list that included two other college players and 17 professionals from the four major American sports.

In 2012, Acho was named Arthur Ashe Jr. Sports Scholar by Diverse: Issues In Higher Education.

During his NFL rookie year, Bleacher Report rated Acho one of the 10 smartest players in the NFL.

Early in the 2017 season, one publication named Acho one of the 6 NFL players with a "genius IQ."

Personal life
Acho is a Christian. Acho got married in 2014 to his wife Ngozi. They have 4 children.

Acho's younger brother, Emmanuel Acho, also played football for Texas, where he was an All Big 12 linebacker in 2011. His brother played four seasons in the NFL with the Cleveland Browns, Philadelphia Eagles, and New York Giants before becoming an analyst for ESPN.

In 2015, while, playing in the NFL, Sam Acho earned an MBA from the Thunderbird School of Global Management in Glendale, Arizona.

Acho and his family return annually to Nigeria in order to participate in their annual Living Hope Christian Ministries' medical mission “Operation Hope”.

Sam Acho is included in a 2016 AOL article, "Six NFL Players with Genius IQ's," which noted that he is fluent in 3 languages: English, Spanish, and Igbo.

In 2017, Acho started “Relevant is Doing a Sports Podcast” with RELEVANT Brand Director Jesse Carey and former Willow Creek Pastor Steve Carter on the RELEVANT Podcast Network. The podcast focuses on the intersection of faith, pop culture, and sports.

See also
Notable alumni of St. Mark's School of Texas

References

External links

Chicago Bears bio
Texas Longhorns bio

1988 births
Living people
Sportspeople from Dallas
Players of American football from Dallas
American football linebackers
American people of Igbo descent
Igbo sportspeople
American sportspeople of Nigerian descent
American football defensive ends
St. Mark's School (Texas) alumni
Texas Longhorns football players
Arizona Cardinals players
Chicago Bears players
Buffalo Bills players
Tampa Bay Buccaneers players
William V. Campbell Trophy winners